D. bakeri may refer to:
 Delphinium bakeri, the Baker's larkspur, a perennial herb species endemic to California
 Ducula bakeri, the Vanuatu Imperial-pigeon, a bird species endemic to Vanuatu

See also
 Bakeri (disambiguation)